The Beautiful Cheat may refer to:

 The Beautiful Cheat (1926 film), an American silent comedy film 
 What a Woman!, also known as The Beautiful Cheat, a 1943 romantic comedy film
 The Beautiful Cheat (1945 film), an American comedy film